Vincent Abril (born March 1, 1995 in Alès, France) is a French-Monégasque race car driver based in Monaco. He was the 2015 Blancpain GT Series Sprint Cup champion.

Racing career 
In 2011, Abril raced in the SEAT León Supercopa France series for Team Speedcar. In a season with six top-tens, he finished 15th in the point standings.

In 2012, Abril returned to the SEAT León Supercopa France series. He started the season with a 2nd place finish at Lédenon followed by a 6th place finish at the same track the following day. After not finishing in 2 of the next 4 races, Abril won his first race in the series at Circuit de Nevers Magny-Cours. In September, Abril finished 2nd and 3rd at Circuito de Navarra. In October, after finishing 3rd in the first race at Circuit Paul Ricard, Abril got his second win of the season at the season finale, which led to a 4th place finish in the points standings.

For 2013, Abril moved to the French GT Championship series, driving an Audi R8 LMS Ultra for Team Speed Car. The season didn't start very well, as Abril finished outside the top-10 in the first 4 races of the season. However, the following month, Abril got his first pole, and race win of the season at Spa-Francorchamps which was then followed by a 3rd place finish the race after at the same track. The same month, Abril had a one-off race at Circuit Paul Ricard with Team Speed Car in the Blancpain Endurance Series, where he finished in 17th. In August, Abril returned to the French GT Championship racing at Val de Vienne where he finished 7th and 14th. The following month, Abril got back to back wins at the Circuit de Nevers Magny-Cours. These wins would eventually help Abril to a 4th place finish in the points standings.

Abril raced in two series throughout 2014, racing for Team Speed Car in the Championnat de France series, and for the Belgian Audi Club Team WRT in the Blancpain GT Series Sprint Cup. This would be a down year for Abril, as he only finished on podium once in both series, and also finished 14th in both point standings.

In 2015, however, Abril had one of the best years of his career. He started the year driving for Bentley Team HTP in both the Blancpain GT Series Sprint Cup and the Blancpain Endurance Series. Even though he didn't show results in the Blancpain Endurance Series, where he finished 20th in the points standings, Abril got 4 wins, 8 podium finishes, and 10 top 5's throughout the season, which helped Abril win the 2015 Blancpain GT Series Sprint Cup championship along with teammate Maximilian Buhk.

In December, Abril raced in the 2015 running of the Sepang 12 Hours for the Bentley Team M-Sport finishing in 10th.

2016 was another season to forget for Abril as he returned to the Blancpain GT Series Sprint Cup Series and the Blancpain Endurance Series. This year however, Abril didn't run the entire season, also failing to finish on the podium even once. This led to Abril finishing 25th in the BES and 24th in the BGTSSC.

In 2016, Abril also ran a race in the Intercontinental GT Challenge series at Spa-Francorchamps where he finished 14th place.

In 2017, for the first time in his career, Abril raced in the Liqui Moly Bathurst 12 Hour, driving the No. 8 Bentley Continental GT3 for Bentley Team M-Sport along with drivers Andy Soucek and Maxime Soulet. The trio started 5th and drove the car to a 12th place finish overall, 5th in their class.

After Bathurst, Abril returned to both series again. In the Blancpain Endurance Series, he finished 2nd in the standings after winning a race at Circuit Paul Ricard and getting on the podium 2 times. Abril also joined the Pirelli World Challenge, finishing the season 13th in the point standings after having a highest finish of 6th.

In 2018, Abril again raced in the Liqui Moly Bathurst 12 Hour, again with Soucek and Soulet. This time however, a tire issue 58 laps in caused the trio to exit the race early, resulting in a 46th place finish overall.

In 2019, Abril, Soucek, and Soulet again raced in the Liqui Moly Bathurst 12 Hour, this time, piloting their car to a 6th place finish overall, a career high finish for the three drivers. Abril also drove the No. 78 Porsche 911 for Proton Competition in the 2019 running of the 24 Hours of Le Mans with drivers Louis and Phillipe Prette. They would finish 36th overall after qualifying in 50th.

For 2021, Abril joined the DTM as the championship swapped to GT3 regulations. Driving for Mercedes-AMG, Abril took pole position for the first race of the season, but slipped back to second in the race. He was later disqualified from both races at the opening weekend, as well as qualifying meaning he lost the points for pole position, due to fuel irregularities.

In 2022 Abril continued racing GT machineries, signing a contract with JP Motorsport and making a full-time switch to GT World Challenge Europe Endurance Cup. Monagesque also contested  Asian Le Mans Series, placing 4th in GT overall classification, as well as took part in 2022 24 Hours of Le Mans, finishing 9th in GTE Am class.

Racing record

Career summary

24 Hours of Le Mans results

Complete Deutsche Tourenwagen Masters results 
(key) (Races in bold indicate pole position) (Races in italics indicate fastest lap)

References

External links 

 https://www.racing-reference.info/driver/Vincent_Abril
 https://www.driverdb.com/drivers/vincent-abril/

Living people
1995 births
French racing drivers
Monegasque racing drivers
24 Hours of Le Mans drivers
Deutsche Tourenwagen Masters drivers
ADAC GT Masters drivers
Blancpain Endurance Series drivers
FIA World Endurance Championship drivers
International GT Open drivers
Asian Le Mans Series drivers
Mercedes-AMG Motorsport drivers
W Racing Team drivers
AF Corse drivers
M-Sport drivers